Redlands school may refer to:

Redlands College, an independent co-educational school in Brisbane, Australia
Redlands, Cremorne, an independent co-educational school in Sydney, Australia
Redlands East Valley High School, a public high school in Redlands, California
Redlands High School, a public high school in Redlands, California

See also
Redlands Unified School District